Baraki (also Romanized as Barakī) is a village in Sofla Rural District, Zavareh District, Ardestan County, Isfahan Province, Iran. At the 2006 census, its population was 22, in 11 families.

References 

Populated places in Ardestan County